Allison Cratchley (born 29 January 1971) is an Australian actress.

Early life
Cratchley was born to parents Kathryn and Noel Cratchley. She grew up in Manly, on Sydney's northern beaches. She is the oldest of three children: she has a brother and a sister.

Career
Cratchley's first notable appearances were on the TV show Neighbours. She was a leading lady in the Australian fast car movie In the Red alongside Damian Bradford and Terry Serio in 1999.

From 1996 to 2001, Cratchley was a regular main cast member of the Australian series Water Rats, playing water policewoman Constable Emma Woods.

In 2006 Cratchley joined the cast of the television series All Saints, in the role of Dr. Zoe Gallagher, a role she played to late 2008. She left to pursue other opportunities.

In 2009 she appeared in a small role on the television series Packed to the Rafters. She also played the role of an experienced diver in the James Cameron 2011 Australian 3D movie Sanctum.

In 2012, Cratchley appeared as Melissa Gregg on the TV series Home and Away, a role she played for several episodes.

Personal life
She is married to Paul Williams. Together they have a daughter and a son.

External links 
 

Australian television actresses
Living people
1975 births